Giuseppe Vigoni (9 July 1846 – 15 February 1914) was an Italian explorer of Africa and geographer. He was a recipient of the Order of Saints Maurice and Lazarus. He was mayor of Milan. He served in the Senate of the Kingdom of Italy.

References

1846 births
1914 deaths
Recipients of the Order of Saints Maurice and Lazarus
Members of the Senate of the Kingdom of Italy
Italian geographers
Explorers of Africa
Mayors of Milan
Italian explorers